Strathbogie is a town in central Victoria, Australia. It is in the Shire of Strathbogie local government area.

The Post Office opened on 10 July 1878.

Golfers play at the course of the Strathbogie Golf Club on Armstrong Avenue.

Strathbogie is located in the Strathbogie Ranges. Mount Wombat (799 metres), which includes a floral and fauna reserve, is 4.6 km. to the north-west.

Town facilities include a general store/ cafe, war memorial and recreation reserve.

Climate 

A pronounced autumnal lag is noted (March being almost as warm as December), and the winters are cool and rainy with many occurrences of snowfall. It has a Mediterranean rainfall pattern, with nearly thrice the rainfall in winter than in high summer.

References

External links

Community website
Strathbogie golf club website

Towns in Victoria (Australia)
Shire of Strathbogie